Meloholic is a 2017 South Korean television series starring Jung Yun-ho and Kyung Soo-jin. It is based on the webtoon of the same name by Team Getname. The series aired on OCN starting November 6, 2017 on Mondays and Tuesdays at 21:00 (KST) time slot. It also aired on mobile app Oksusu on November 1, 2017.

The drama won Best Writer award at the  12th International Busan Contents Market.

Synopsis
About a man with the power to read women's thought when he touches them. His superpower makes it difficult for him to date someone. He comes across a woman who actually says what she thinks, but she turns out to have split personalities.

Cast

Main
Jung Yun-ho as Yoo Eun-ho
A heartthrob who has the special power to read women's minds. 
Kyung Soo-jin as Han Ye-ri / Han Joo-ri 
A woman with two split personalities.

Supporting
Han Joo-wan as Kim Sun-ho
Choi Dae-chul as Kim Joo-seung
Ahn Sol-bin as Kim Min-jung 
Han Jae-suk as Yoo Shik 
Kim Min-kyu as Yoo Byung-chul
Go Min-si as Joo Yeon-jin
Song Yoo-ji as Je-yi

Special appearance
Gong Seung-yeon as a reckless nurse
Jeon Se-hyun as Professor Park
Clara Lee as Yun Kyung-ae
Yoon So-hee
 Kim Ki-doo as pervert (Ep.4)
Jun

Production
The series is directed by Song Hyun-wook of Marriage, Not Dating, Another Miss Oh and Introverted Boss.

Original soundtrack

Part 1

Part 2

Part 3

Part 4

Part 5

References

External links
  
 
 

2017 South Korean television series debuts
Korean-language television shows
South Korean romantic comedy television series
South Korean fantasy television series
South Korean mystery television series
OCN television dramas
Television shows based on South Korean webtoons
Television series by KBS Media
South Korean pre-produced television series
2017 South Korean television series endings
Wavve original programming